Silvan Lake is a reservoir in the U.S. state of Georgia.

A variant spelling is "Sylvan Lake". The lake's name means "wood lake".

References

Reservoirs in Georgia (U.S. state)
Bodies of water of Rabun County, Georgia